Muyegbe Mubala (born 12 December 1970) is a Congolese sprinter. She competed in the women's 100 metres at the 1992 Summer Olympics.

References

External links
 

1970 births
Living people
Athletes (track and field) at the 1992 Summer Olympics
Democratic Republic of the Congo female sprinters
Olympic athletes of the Democratic Republic of the Congo
Place of birth missing (living people)
Olympic female sprinters